Víctor Manuel Miranda  (born 27 July 1982) is a Panamanian football defender.

Club career
Miranda played 10 matches for Universidad Costa Rica in the Primera Division de Costa Rica in the 2007-08 season.

He was released by Alianza in summer 2010.

International career
Miranda played for the Panama U-23 squad during qualifying for the 2004 Olympics.

Miranda has made 17 appearances for the full Panama national football team, including six qualifying matches for the 2006 FIFA World Cup. He made his debut in a friendly against Trinidad and Tobago on June 10, 2001.

His final international was a January 2005 friendly match against Ecuador.

References

External links
 

1982 births
Living people
People from La Chorrera District
Association football defenders
Panamanian footballers
Panama international footballers
San Francisco F.C. players
C.D. Árabe Unido players
Tauro F.C. players
C.F. Universidad de Costa Rica footballers
Sporting San Miguelito players
Alianza Panama players
Panamanian expatriate footballers
Expatriate footballers in Costa Rica